John S. Tuohy is a retired brigadier general in the United States Air Force, last serving as the Assistant Adjutant General and Commander of the Washington Air National Guard (WA ANG), in which capacity he commanded 34 units and the 2,100 personnel attached to those units, while managing a budget of $50,000,000.  General Tuohy was responsible to the Adjutant General of Washington, Major General Bret D. Daugherty, "to prepare, implement and administer plans, policies and programs to effectively organize, staff, equip and train units for state and federal mobilization." Additionally, General Tuohy oversaw the Washington Youth Academy, a division of the National Guard Youth Challenge Program in Bremerton, Washington, which provides quasi-military training and mentoring programs for 300 at-risk youths each year. Prior to his last assignment, then-Colonel Tuohy served as the Washington National Guard's Director of United States Property and Fiscal Office, in which capacity he was primarily responsible for receiving and accounting for all funds and property - in excess of $1,300,000,000 - of the United States in the possession of the Washington National Guard and ensuring that Federal funds were "obligated and expended in conformance with applicable statutes and regulations."

Early life and education

The son of a United States Navy aviation machinist's mate, first class (AMM1), whose service during World War II ended with an honorable discharge for medical reasons after his PB2Y Coronado crashed on a training exercise, Tuohy was born on 23 November 1956 in St. Petersburg, Florida. In 1974, he graduated from St. Petersburg High School. In 1978, he graduated from Florida State University (FSU) with a Bachelor of Science degree in management. Upon graduation, he was commissioned in the United States Air Force through the FSU Det 145 Reserve Officer Training Corps with honors as a Distinguished Graduate (top 10% of his class). He was also selected as the Det 145 Cadet Wing Commander. Additionally, he is a graduate of Squadron Officer School, Air Command and Staff College, Air Ground Operations School (twice Distinguished Graduate), and Air War College.

General officer

Promoted to brigadier general on 3 May 2014, Tuohy continued to serve in his role as assistant adjutant general for the Washington Air National Guard (WA ANG), which began in November 2013, while also assuming command of the WA ANG. During his tenure as Commander and Assistant Adjutant General - Air, Tuohy commanded the 141st Air Refueling Wing, the 194th Regional Support Wing, and the Western Air Defense Sector, which spanned 12 operational missions and five major commands, while simultaneously spearheading a cyber schoolhouse initiative. Tuohy's reputation as a responsible leader and masterful communicator led to a by-name request to serve on the Fiscal Stewardship Working Group tasked by the Chief of the National Guard Bureau General Frank J. Grass to write the fiscal stewardship comprehension plan for the National Guard of the United States. He also led the Washington Air National Guard in response to the unprecedented 2014 Oso Mudslide, the worst wildfires in the state's history, and the national level 2016 Cascadia Rising Exercise - the largest earthquake exercise in Washington state history simulating a 9.0 Cascadia Subduction Zone earthquake and tsunami along the Washington and Oregon coast. Additionally, he balanced the largest contingency deployments of Washington Airmen to date and the first Air National Guard activation and employment of a cyber protection team, while developing a benchmark mentorship program in the form of his popular off-hour "Fireside Chats," which often incorporated inspirational leaders including United States Air Force Ace Brigadier General Richard Stephen Ritchie.

Retirement

On 13 August 2017, after exactly 39 years of service, Brigadier General Tuohy celebrated the change of command of the Washington Air National Guard and his retirement in a ceremony at the Pierce County Readiness Center on Camp Murray. During this ceremony, he was awarded the Air Force Distinguished Service Medal and the Washington National Guard Distinguished Service Medal by Brigadier General (Ret.) Craig W. Blankenstein, the former Vice Commander of the Washington Air National Guard and close friend. "At the end of the day, here's what I want to leave you with, and here's what's important -- General Tuohy always got it right from matter of priorities. He was true to his values, and I have never worked with a man with higher integrity. It's quite simple...the whole time I worked with General Tuohy, it was always about the people," said Blankenstein. Additionally, Tuohy was presented with a U.S flag, which was flown over the United States Capitol on 28 June 2017 at the request of The Honorable Maria Cantwell, United States Senator, in honor of his retirement. The flag was also flown at the 141st Air Refueling Wing, the 194th Regional Support Wing, and the 225th Air Defense Group, representing the three major organizations of the Washington Air National Guard. The Washington State Secretary of State, Kim Wyman also presented Tuohy with a Washington state flag, which was flown over the Washington State Capitol in his honor. During the change of command ceremony, the Adjutant General of Washington state, Major General Bret D. Daugherty said, "[Brigadier General Tuohy] has served with great success, clearly, at all levels of command, as well as serving as our Human Resources Officer, our Chief of Staff of the Joint Force Headquarters, our State Partnerships Director in the early years when we got things going with Thailand, and our United States Property and Fiscal Officer. His hallmark successes include being the very first commander of the 194th Wing, along with pioneering an initiative for a joint cyber training schoolhouse to safeguard our critical infrastructure here in the state...Winston Churchill once said, 'We make a living by what we get, but we make a life by what we give' and John Tuohy, I believe, is the embodiment of that sentiment."

Military career

General Tuohy has served the following assignments:
 January 1979 - July 1979, Student, Undergraduate Navigator Training, Mather Air Force Base, California
 July 1979 - February 1980, Student, Electronic Warfare Officer Training, Mather Air Force Base, California
 February 1980 - June 1980, Student, Combat Crew Training Course, Castle Air Force Base, California
 June 1980 - November 1984, Electronic Warfare Officer, B-52, 325th Bombardment Squadron, Fairchild Air Force Base, Washington
 December 1984 - June 1987, Officer in Charge, Operating Location, Administration, Headquarters Washington Air National Guard, Camp Murray, Washington
 June 1987 - June 1989, Cost Management Officer, Headquarters Washington Air National Guard, Operating Location BA, Camp Murray, Washington
 June 1989 - June 1991, Air Operations Officer, 111th Air Support Operations Center Squadron, Camp Murray, Washington
 June 1991 - June 1992, Fighter Duty Officer, 111th Air Support Operations Center Squadron, Camp Murray, Washington
 June 1992 - December 1994, Senior Fighter Duty Officer, 111th Air Support Operations Center Squadron, Camp Murray, Washington
 December 1994 - September 1996, Director of Operations, 111th Air Support Operations Center Squadron, Camp Murray, Washington
 October 1996 - September 1997, Director of Operations, Headquarters 252d Combat Communications Group, Camp Murray, Washington
 October 1997 - May 1999, Commander, 111th Air Support Operations Center Squadron, Camp Murray, Washington
 June 1999 - May 2001, Commander, Detachment 1, Headquarters Washington Air National Guard, Camp Murray, Washington
 July 2001 - July 2003, Human Resource Officer, Headquarters Washington Air National Guard, Camp Murray, Washington
 July 2003 - June 2005, Chief of Staff, Joint Force Headquarters, Washington National Guard, Camp Murray, Washington
 June 2005 - June 2006, Commander, Detachment 1, Headquarters Washington Air National Guard, Camp Murray, Washington
 June 2006 - June 2008, Commander, 194th Regional Support Wing, Camp Murray, Washington
 June 2008 - November 2013, United States Property & Fiscal Officer, Camp Murray, Washington
 November 2013 – August 2017, Commander and Assistant Adjutant General - Air, Headquarters, Washington Air National Guard, Camp Murray, Washington

Flight information
Rating: Navigator  

Flight hours: More than 1,200

Aircraft flown: 
Boeing B-52 Stratofortress, Cessna T-37 Tweet, Boeing T-43

Education
 1978 Florida State University, Bachelor of Science, Management, Tallahassee, Florida
 1990 Squadron Officer School, by correspondence
 1994 Air Command and Staff College, by seminar, McChord AFB, Washington
 Air Ground Operations School, twice Distinguished Graduate
 1999 Air War College, by correspondence
 2014 Senior Leader Orientation Course, Joint Base Andrews, Maryland

Awards and decorations

Effective dates of promotion

Additional recognitions
On 25 Mar 2016, Major General Chaivuth Yuthasilkul, Commanding General, Royal Thai Army Aviation Center presented Brig Gen Tuohy with Royal Thai Army Aviation wings at the Aviation Center in Lop Buri Province, Kingdom of Thailand. The Washington National Guard senior leadership visited the Kingdom as part of the National Guard State Partnership Program.

On 13 Aug 2017, at his retirement ceremony, Brig Gen Tuohy was presented with a Wall of Honor Certificate on behalf of the Washington National Guard JAG Corps, signifying the addition of his name to the Smithsonian National Air and Space Museum Wall of Honor for his impact on military aviation.

Professional boards, memberships, and affiliations
 Washington Youth Academy (a division of the Youth Challenge Program) Board of Directors
 Goodwill Industries of the Olympics and Rainier Region Board of Directors
 Washington National Guard Museum Board of Advisors
 Military Officers Association of America
 National Guard Association of the United States
 National Guard Association of Washington

References

External links
 http://www.northwestmilitary.com/news/news-front/2014/05/chat-with-brigadier-general-john-s-tuohy/
 http://mil.wa.gov/blog/news/post/push-to-help-guardsmen-stay-overnight-in-armories
 http://www.dvidshub.net/news/143933/111th-air-support-operations-squadron-rediscovers-their-heritage#.VMqAtWjF-So
 http://www.dvidshub.net/video/362443/pow-mia-ceremony#.VMqCzWjF-So
 http://www.greaterspokane.org/blog/2015/04/armed-forces-persons-of-the-year-recognized/
 https://www.dvidshub.net/news/162105/225th-air-defense-group-activated-wads#.VUadKlJHanM
 https://static.dvidshub.net/media/pubs/pdf_27375.pdf (p. 38-39)
 https://static.dvidshub.net/media/pubs/pdf_25859.pdf (p. 1-2)
 https://www.dvidshub.net/publication/issues/27681 (p. 2,6)
 http://mil.wa.gov/blog/news/post/state-partnership-program-a-historic-visit-to-the-kingdom-of-thailand
 http://lexingtoninstitute.org/brigadier-general-john-tuohys-speech-national-guards-role-cybersecurity-u-s-power-grid/
 http://fedscoop.com/washington-national-guard-power-grid-partnership
 https://m.youtube.com/watch?v=L04NhynkrOg
 http://nationalinterest.org/blog/the-buzz/six-principles-the-national-guards-cybersecurity-role-17216
 http://www.cybersecuritytrend.com/news/2016/09/30/8429384.htm
 http://www.nationalguardmagazine.com/publication/?i=346142&ver=html5&p=20#{"page":22,"issue_id":346142}
 http://wsac.org/smoking-is-the-1-cause-of-preventable-death/
 http://www.pacom.mil/Media/News/News-Article-View/Article/1125840/c7f-uss-coronado-highlight-us-participation-at-langkawi-international-maritime/
 http://mil.wa.gov/blog/news/post/brig-gen-tuohy-retiring-horn-is-next-commander-of-washington-air-national-guard
 http://www.northwestmilitary.com/news/news-front/2017/08/a-day-of-transition-for-the-washington-national-guard/
 https://www.dvidshub.net/news/244713/change-command-washington-air-national-guard
 https://issuu.com/wanationalguard/docs/08.16.2017_summer_evergreen (p. 37)
 https://m.mil.wa.gov/blog/news/post/looking-back-on-a-storied-career
 https://www.dvidshub.net/news/216360/close-air-support-detachment-operated-mcchord-25-years
 https://www.dvidshub.net/news/305740/111th-air-support-operations-squadron-30-years-service
 https://www.dvidshub.net/news/402558/194th-wing-air-guards-first-non-flying-wing-2006

Air War College alumni
Florida State University alumni
Squadron Officer School alumni
United States Air Force generals
Air Command and Staff College alumni
National Guard (United States) generals
Recipients of the Air Force Distinguished Service Medal
Recipients of the Legion of Merit
Recipients of the Meritorious Service Decoration
Living people
1956 births
St. Petersburg High School alumni